Akhtem Zakirov is a Russian boxer. He participated at the 2021 AIBA World Boxing Championships, being awarded the bronze medal in the flyweight event.

References

External links 

Living people
Place of birth missing (living people)
Year of birth missing (living people)
Russian male boxers
Flyweight boxers
AIBA World Boxing Championships medalists